Scott Stanley Haraburda (born 1963) is an American soldier, engineer, inventor, and 2nd dan judoka.  In addition to making key contributions to the development of heat exchangers and spacecraft propulsion, he led a team of military officers in 2007 to Kuwait to correct many of the contingency contracting problems identified by the Gansler Commission.  He is known nationally as the president of the Indiana Society of Professional Engineers who led the opposition to a state governmental panel recommendation in 2015 to eliminate licensing of engineers in Indiana.

Early life
Scott Haraburda grew up in Grand Rapids, Michigan, where he graduated from Creston High School in 1981 and then from Grand Rapids Junior College. In 2017, this college named Scott its distinguished alumnus for the year. While living in Grand Rapids, he worked as the department store Santa for Herpolsheimer's, the same store mentioned in the 2004 Christmas film The Polar Express.

Career

Military

Colonel Scott S. Haraburda spent nearly three decades serving in the US Army, providing significant contributions to military logistics, CBRNE defense, and military science.  In 1991, while he was teaching chemistry at the United States Military Academy, the Army Astronaut Nomination Selection Board nominated Haraburda as a NASA astronaut candidate.  
A few years later, by means of a competitive selection at the rank of Major, he served as a representative of the United States to Germany in 1995 through the Army Reserve's Foreign Exchange Program with the Bundeswehr, Germany's army.  In 2005, he served as the Executive Secretary of the Army Science Board, helping its distinguished members of corporate executive managers, senior academians, and retired military flag officers formulate recommendations to scientific and technological matters of concern to the Army.

Military Logistics
In late 2007, Colonel Haraburda deployed to Kuwait for a year to help correct the contingency contracting problems plaguing the war zone.  The Army deployed him to Camp Arifjan to lead a small military team of logistics officers in applying the LOGCAP methods as part of the Gansler Report's second recommendation solution.

CBRNE Defense
As the commander of the 472d Chemical Battalion from 2002 through 2004 with the rank of Lieutenant Colonel, he integrated his units' training with civilian agencies, such as fire departments, police stations, hospitals, and non-governmental organizations (e.g., American Red Cross) to improve the Defense Support of Civil Authorities capabilities for large-scale chemical defense missions.  As a result, he was the first commander selected to provide operational command and control over nearly 400 Chemical, Biological, Radiological, Nuclear and high- yield Explosives (CBRNE) defense soldiers in Operation Red Dragon in 2004.  While commander of the 464th Chemical Brigade from 2006 to 2007, Colonel Haraburda provided command and control over the same exercise in 2006, this time commanding over 1,100 chemical, military police, and medical soldiers.  Another major contribution he provided to CBRNE soldiers was his recommendations on ways to improve their leadership capabilities, using ideas he derived from his various military leadership assignments and theories learned as a graduate of the Army War College and the Army Command and General Staff College, military colleges that prepare officers for senior leadership assignments and responsibilities.

Engineering

The National Society of Professional Engineers named Dr. Scott S. Haraburda a Fellow in 2013 in recognition for long-term service with the Society, as well as to the engineering profession and the community (an honor given to less than 1% of its members).  And from 2014 until 2015, he served as the president of the Indiana Society of Professional Engineers (ISPE).  While president of ISPE, he publicly led an effort to oppose a state governmental panel recommendation in 2015 to eliminate licensing of engineers in the State of Indiana, causing Governor Mike Pence to soon issue a statement opposing the recommendation as well.  Furthermore, in 2001, he earned a doctorate in chemical engineering from Michigan State University.

Plastics

As an inventor, he holds two United States patents and seven patent publications.  One of Dr. Haraburda's patents involved a measurement system to be used in the plastics industry, which he used in a project identified by Chemical Processing magazine with its Project of the Year award in 1998 as one of the best projects in the chemical industry.  In the 1990s, he worked as a plastics engineer for Bayer Corporation and General Electric Plastics.

Aerospace

Dr. Haraburda made significant contributions into optimizing the engineering designs of spacecraft propulsion and heat exchangers.  In the early 1990s, he conducted research on a Microwave Electrothermal Thruster, to which he developed a simple equilibrium based theory of space-dependent parameters for transport design equations, using helium as the monatomic gas and nitrogen as the diatomic gas.  In the mid-1990s, Dr. Haraburda also designed Helical-coil heat exchangers for fluids with components in multiple phases (solids, liquids, and gases).

Munitions

Dr. Haraburda directed manufacturing and engineering for Crane Army Ammunition Activity.

Personal life

Judo
In 1998, Scott won the Indiana Men's Master Middleweight Judo Championship title. Two years later, the United States Judo Association promoted him to black belt rank of Nidan (2nd dan).

Bibliography
 Christian Controversies: Seeking the Truth , Meaningful Publications, 2013.
 Premonitions of the Palladion Project , LuLu Publishing, 2008.

Notes

References

External links 
 Indiana Society of Professional Engineers
 List of National Society of Professional Engineers Fellows
 Central Michigan University ROTC Hall of Fame
 Google Scholar citations for Scott Haraburda
 Chemical Processing magazine

1963 births
Living people
American chemical engineers
American male judoka
American patent holders
Recipients of the Legion of Merit
Grand Rapids Community College alumni
United States Army War College alumni
Michigan State University alumni
Central Michigan University alumni
Military personnel from Indiana
Military personnel from Michigan
United States Army Command and General Staff College alumni
United States Army colonels
United States Military Academy faculty
United States Army Science Board people
20th-century American inventors
21st-century American inventors